The Western Beskids are a set of mountain ranges spanning the Czech Republic, Slovakia, and Poland. Geologically the Western Beskids are part of the Outer Western Carpathians. 

Traditionally the Western Beskids were considered part of the Beskids, a term that differs according to historical and linguistic heritage.

Subdivision

The Western Beskids consist of the following mountain ranges:  

Western section of the Western Beskids:
Hostýn-Vsetín Mountains (Czech: Hostýnsko-vsetínská hornatina) → e1
Moravian-Silesian Beskids (Czech: Moravskoslezské Beskydy, Slovak: Moravsko-sliezske Beskydy) → e2
Turzovka Highlands (Slovak: Turzovská vrchovina) → e3
Jablunkov Furrow (Czech: Jablunkovská brázda) → e4
Rožnov Furrow (Czech: Rožnovská brázda) → e5
Jablunkov Intermontane (Slovak: Jablunkovské medzihorie, Czech: Jablunkovské mezihoří) → e6
Silesian Beskids (Polish: Beskid Śląski, Czech: Slezské Beskydy) → e7
Żywiec Basin (Polish: Kotlina Żywiecka) → e8

Northern section of the Western Beskids:
Little Beskids → f1
Maków Beskids → f2
Island Beskids → f3
Gorce Mountains → f4
Rabka Basin → f5
Sącz Basin → f6

Central section of the Western Beskids: 
Orava Beskids (SK: Oravské Beskydy) + Żywiec Beskids (PL: Beskid Żywiecki) (the older SK equivalent of Beskid Zywiecki is "Slovenské Beskydy" - Slovak Beskids or "Kysucko-oravské Beskydy" - Kysuce-Orava Beskids) → g1
Kysuce Beskids (SK: Kysucké Beskydy) +Żywiec Beskids (PL: Beskid Żywiecki) (the older SK equivalent of Beskid Zywiecki is "Slovenské Beskydy" or "Kysucko-oravské Beskydy") → g2
Orava Magura (SK: Oravská Magura) → g3
Orava Highlands (SK: Oravská vrchovina) → g4
Sub-Beskidian Furrow (SK: Podbeskydská brázda) → g5
Sub-Beskidian Highlands (SK: Podbeskydská vrchovina) → g6

Eastern section of the Western Beskids: 
Beskid Sądecki → h1
Čergov → h2
Pieniny → h3

See also

Maps

Sources

External links

 Encyclopedia of Ukraine: Western Beskyd

Mountain ranges of the Western Carpathians
Mountain ranges of Slovakia
Mountain ranges of the Czech Republic
Mountain ranges of Poland
Lesser Poland Voivodeship
Silesian Voivodeship